The 2019 NCAA Division I Field Hockey Championship is the 39th annual tournament organized by the NCAA, to determine the national champion of Division I women's college field hockey in the United States. 

The semifinals and championship match will be played at Kentner Stadium at Wake Forest University in Winston-Salem, North Carolina from November 22 to 24, 2019.

Qualified teams

 A total of 18 teams qualified for the 2019 tournament, the same number of teams as 2018. 10 teams received automatic bids by winning their conference tournaments and an additional 8 teams earned at-large bids based on their regular season records.

Automatic qualifiers

At-large qualifiers

Bracket

See also 
NCAA Division II Field Hockey Championship
NCAA Division III Field Hockey Championship

References 

NCAA Division I Field Hockey Championship
NCAA Division I Field Hockey Championship
NCAA Division I Field Hockey Championship
NCAA Division I Field Hockey Championship